The term breath control may mean:

 Anapanasati Buddhist breath meditation practice
 Pranayama, a yogic technique for controlling breathing
 Qigong breathing practice
Xingqi (circulating breath), Daoist breath-control technique
 Vocal technique used in singing
 Breath Control: The History of the Human Beat Box
 Erotic asphyxiation, a BDSM sexual technique where one partner controls the breathing or airway of the other. When used as a self-induced technique for sexual pleasure via breath control it is called autoerotic asphyxiation.
 Wind controller, an electronic wind instrument.